Pandori  is a village in Phagwara Tehsil in Kapurthala district of Punjab State, India. The village is administrated by a Sarpanch who is an elected representative of village as per the constitution of India and Panchayati raj (India).

Transport
Kartarpur railway station and Hamira railway station are the very nearby railway stations to Pandori however, Jalandhar City Rail Way station is 25 km away from the village.  The village is 76 km away from Sri Guru Ram Dass Jee International Airport in Amritsar and the another nearest airport is Sahnewal Airport  in Ludhiana which is located 86 km away from the village.  Kapurthala, Urmar Tanda, Jalandhar, Kartarpur are the nearby Cities to Pandori village.

References

External links
  Villages in Kapurthala
 Kapurthala Villages List

Villages in Kapurthala district